Kristina Yngwe (born 14 July 1983) is a Swedish Centre Party politician. She has been a member of the Riksdag since 2014.

References 

Living people
1983 births
Members of the Riksdag 2014–2018
Members of the Riksdag 2018–2022
Members of the Riksdag from the Centre Party (Sweden)
21st-century Swedish women politicians
Women members of the Riksdag